Chris Campbell (born December 12, 1963) is an American politician and audiologist serving as a member of the Indiana House of Representatives from House District 26. She assumed office on November 7, 2018.

Early life and education 
Campbell was born in La Porte, Indiana. She earned a Bachelor of Science and Master of Science in audiology from Purdue University.

Career 
Campbell began her career as an audiology fellow at the Indianapolis Hearing Center. She later worked as an audiologist at the Lifeline Rehabilitation Center, Saint Elizabeth Regional Health & Home Hospital, and Lafayette ENT. She was elected to the Indiana House of Representatives in November 2018. Since 2019, she has served as ranking member of the House Government and Regulatory Reform Committee.

References 

1963 births
Living people
People from La Porte, Indiana
People from LaPorte County, Indiana
Purdue University alumni
Audiologists
Democratic Party members of the Indiana House of Representatives
Women state legislators in Indiana
21st-century American politicians
21st-century American women politicians